The women's freestyle 72 kilograms is a competition featured at the 2021 World Wrestling Championships, and was held in Oslo, Norway on 6 and 7 October.

This freestyle wrestling competition consists of a single-elimination tournament, with a repechage used to determine the winner of two bronze medals. The two finalists face off for gold and silver medals. Each wrestler who loses to one of the two finalists moves into the repechage, culminating in a pair of bronze medal matches featuring the semifinal losers each facing the remaining repechage opponent from their half of the bracket.

Each bout consists of a single round within a six-minute limit including two halves of three minutes. The wrestler who scores more points is the winner.

Masako Furuichi from Japan won the gold medal after beating Zhamila Bakbergenova of Kazakhstan in the final 3–0. Furuichi scored an early two points takedown and later received one more point for pushing her opponent out of the mat. Buse Tosun from Turkey and Anna Schell of Germany shared the bronze medals.

Results
Legend
F — Won by fall
WO — Won by walkover

Main bracket

Repechage

Final standing

References

External links
Official website

Women's freestyle 72 kg
2021 in women's sport wrestling